The 2013–14 season was the 115th season of competitive league football in the history of English football club Wolverhampton Wanderers. The club competed in League One, the third tier of the English football system for the first time since 1988–89. The previous season had brought relegation for a second successive season.

Former Millwall manager Kenny Jackett was appointed as Wolves' new head coach in the close season, replacing Dean Saunders who was fired after overseeing their relegation.

The team achieved promotion back to the Championship with four games to spare, setting a new club record points tally for a season in the process. Their third title at this level was confirmed on 21 April as the team went on to create a new record points amount for the third tier, reaching 103 points.

Season review

After a second consecutive relegation and four different managers during the previous sixteen months, Kenny Jackett, who had resigned from Millwall weeks earlier, was appointed on 31 May 2013 in the newly titled role of head coach. When pre-season training began on 24 June, Jackett announced that four key first team players – Karl Henry, Stephen Ward, Jamie O’Hara and Roger Johnson – were all now transfer-listed and that he intended to make greater usage of the club's academy players. In addition to the transfer listed players, further key players such as Sylvan Ebanks-Blake, Stephen Hunt and Christophe Berra did not have their contracts renewed as the club sought to reduce their salary commitments. Only three new signings were made during the summer transfer window: free signing Sam Ricketts, who became club captain, as well as Kevin McDonald and Scott Golbourne from Sheffield United and Barnsley, respectively.

Wolves' first fixture in the third tier since 1989 was a goalless draw at Preston. This was followed by five consecutive league wins to bring the team into the automatic promotion places and earn Jackett a nomination for August's Manager of the Month Award. Despite their unbeaten league run being ended by local rivals Walsall, a run of eleven unbeaten matches brought them to the top of the table by mid-November.

The following seven matches brought only one victory though, and by early January both Leyton Orient and Brentford stood above Wolves with further games in hand. Wolves sought to strength their squad and recruited five players during the January transfer window - two being loan deals of James Henry and Michael Jacobs being made into permanent signings. Strikers Leigh Griffiths and Kevin Doyle (on loan) were both allowed to leave, with two former players, Nouha Dicko and Leon Clarke being bought as replacements.

With this new squad, the team recorded a club record nine straight victories - including a 3–0 success at promotion rivals Brentford - to return to the top of the table. Although suffering a final defeat of the campaign at Crawley in mid-March, on 12 April, promotion was secured with a 2–0 win at Crewe Alexandra that ensured the club's exit from League One after a solitary season. After two further wins, they were confirmed as champions after Brentford failed to beat MK Dons hours after Wolves had won at Leyton Orient, who had led the table for much of the early part of the season.

A final day win that relegated Carlisle ensured that Wolves set a new points record for the third tier as they reached 103 points. En route to the title, the team also set numerous new club records, including a new points record (surpassing the 92 points they set when last in the third tier) and a record nine consecutive wins, as well as equalling their previous best run of five consecutive away wins. At the conclusion of the season, Kenny Jackett was joint-winner of the LMA Awards Manager of the Year for League One, having earlier won the monthly award for March 2014.

Results

Pre season

League One

A total of 24 teams competed in League One in the 2013–14 season. Each team played every other team twice, once at their stadium, and once at the opposition's. Three points were awarded to teams for each win, one point per draw, and none for defeats.

The provisional fixture list was released on 19 June 2013 with the exception of the club's opening fixture, which was announced one day earlier having been selected as part of The Football League's 125th anniversary.

Final table

Results summary

Results by round

FA Cup

League Cup

Football League Trophy

Players

Statistics

|-
|align="left"|||align="left"|||align="left"|  ¤†
|0||0||0||0||0||0||0||0||0||0||0||0||
|-
|align="left"|||align="left"|||align="left"| 
|||1||0||0||1||0||1||0||||1||3||0||
|-
|align="left"|||align="left"|||align="left"| 
|||0||1||0||0||0||2||0||||0||1||0||
|-
|align="left"|||align="left"|||align="left"| 
|||9||1||0||0||0||0||0||||9||0||0||
|-
|align="left"|||align="left"|||align="left"| 
|||2||2||0||0||0||||0||||2||4||1||
|-
|align="left"|||align="left"|||align="left"| 
|46||2||2||0||1||0||1||0||50||2||10||0||
|-
|align="left"|||align="left"|||style="background:#faecc8; text-align:left;"|  ‡
|||10||1||0||0||0||1||0||style="background:#98FB98"|||10||6||0||
|-
|align="left"|||align="left"|||align="left"| 
|||0||1||0||1||0||1||0||||0||8||0||
|-
|align="left"|||align="left"|FW||align="left"|  †
|||12||||1||1||0||1||0||||13||1||0||
|-
|align="left"|||align="left"|FW||align="left"| 
|||1||0||0||0||0||0||0||||1||1||0||
|-
|align="left"|10||align="left"|||align="left"| 
|||12||1||0||0||0||1||1||||13||5||0||
|-
|align="left"|11||align="left"|||align="left"| 
|||5||1||0||0||0||2||0||style="background:#98FB98"|||5||8||0||
|-
|align="left"|12||align="left"|||align="left"| 
|||0||0||0||1||0||||0||||0||0||0||
|-
|align="left"|13||align="left"|||align="left"| 
|41||0||2||0||1||0||1||0||45||0||2||0||
|-
|align="left"|14||align="left"|||align="left"| 
|||2||||0||||0||0||0||style="background:#98FB98"|||2||5||0||
|-
|align="left"|15||align="left"|FW||align="left"|  ¤
|||2||1||0||0||0||||0||||2||2||0||
|-
|align="left"|16||align="left"|FW||align="left"|  ¤
|||0||2||0||1||0||1||0||||0||2||0||
|-
|align="left"|17||align="left"|||align="left"|  ¤
|0||0||0||0||0||0||0||0||0||0||0||0||
|-
|align="left"|18||align="left"|||align="left"|  (c)
|||2||||0||0||0||0||0||style="background:#98FB98"|||2||3||0||
|-
|align="left"|19||align="left"|||align="left"| 
|||0||2||0||0||0||2||0||style="background:#98FB98"|||0||4||0||
|-
|align="left"|20||align="left"|FW||align="left"|  ¤
|||1||0||0||||0||||1||||2||0||0||
|-
|align="left"|21||align="left"|||align="left"|  ¤
|||0||||0||1||0||0||0||||0||1||0||
|-
|align="left"|22||align="left"|||align="left"|  ¤
|0||0||0||0||1||0||0||0||||0||0||0||
|-
|align="left"|22||align="left"|FW||align="left"|  ¤
|0||0||0||0||0||0||0||0||0||0||0||0||
|-
|align="left"|23||align="left"|||align="left"| 
|||2||1||0||1||0||1||0||style="background:#98FB98"|||2||0||0||
|-
|align="left"|25||align="left"|||align="left"| 
|||0||0||0||0||0||0||0||||0||0||0||
|-
|align="left"|26||align="left"|||align="left"| 
|||1||2||1||0||0||2||0||style="background:#98FB98"|||2||1||0||
|-
|align="left"|27||align="left"|||style="background:#faecc8; text-align:left;"|  ‡
|||8||0||0||0||0||0||0||style="background:#98FB98"|||8||1||0||
|-
|align="left"|28||align="left"|||align="left"|  ¤
|0||0||0||0||0||0||0||0||0||0||0||0||
|-
|align="left"|29||align="left"|FW||align="left"|  ¤
|||3||||0||||0||0||0||||3||1||0||
|-
|align="left"|31||align="left"|||align="left"|  ¤
|||0||0||0||0||0||1||0||style="background:#98FB98"|||0||0||0||
|-
|align="left"|32||align="left"|||align="left"|  ¤
|||1||0||0||1||0||1||0||||1||0||0||
|-
|align="left"|34||align="left"|||align="left"|  ¤
|0||0||0||0||0||0||0||0||0||0||0||0||
|-
|align="left"|39||align="left"|||align="left"|  ¤
|0||0||0||0||0||0||0||0||0||0||0||0||
|-
|align="left"|40||align="left"|FW||align="left"| 
|||12||0||0||0||0||0||0||||12||2||0||
|-
|align="left"|41||align="left"|||align="left"| 
|0||0||0||0||0||0||0||0||0||0||0||0||
|-
|align="left"|47||align="left"|||align="left"| 
|0||0||0||0||0||0||0||0||0||0||0||0||
|-
|align="left"|50||align="left"|FW||align="left"| 
|0||0||0||0||0||0||0||0||0||0||0||0||
|}

Awards

Transfers

In

Out

Loans in

Loans out

Management and coaching staff

Kit
The season brought both new home and away kits manufactured by new supplier PUMA, who had previously worked with Wolves during the 1990s. The new home kit featured the club's traditional gold and black colours, while the away kit was all purple with white trimming. Both shirts featured new sponsor What House?, a property company that had agreed a two-year deal with the football club.

References

2013–14 Football League One by team
2013-14